Under the Radar may refer to:

Albums
 Under the Radar (Dispatch album), 2002
 Under the Radar (Grade album), 1999
 Under the Radar (Taylor Hicks album), 2005
 Under the Radar (Little Feat album), 1998
 Under the Radar (Daniel Powter album), 2008
 Under the Radar Volume 1, 2014 album by Robbie Williams
 Under the Radar Volume 2, 2017 album by Robbie Williams

Film and television 
 Under the Radar (film), a 2004 Australian comedy
 Under the Radar (NCIS), an episode of the American police procedural drama NCIS
 "Under the Radar" (White Collar), an episode from the TV series White Collar

Other uses 
 Under the Radar (magazine), an American music magazine
 "Underneath the Radar" (song), a 1988 song by Underworld
 Under the Radar Festival, a theater festival in New York City